Alexander (Alec) Patrick Bell (23 February 1915 – 12 April 1956) was an Argentine born English cricketer and rugby union player.  Bell was a right-handed batsman and played centre for the Northampton Saints rugby team.  He was born at Rosario, Santa Fe.

Bell made three first-class appearances for Northamptonshire in the 1934 County Championship against Worcestershire, Middlesex and Glamorgan.  In these three matches, he scored a total of just 37 runs at an average of 6.16, with a high score of 24.  He later made thirteen Minor Counties Championship appearances for Hertfordshire between 1946 and 1949.

As a rugby player he was a prolific try-scoring centre and captained the Northampton Saints for 3 years from 1943 to 1946.

Bell died from a brain trauma at Oxford, Oxfordshire on 12 April 1956.

References

External links
Alexander Bell at ESPNcricinfo
Alexander Bell at CricketArchive

1915 births
1956 deaths
Sportspeople from Rosario, Santa Fe
English cricketers
Northamptonshire cricketers
Hertfordshire cricketers
Rugby union centres
Northampton Saints players
Argentine emigrants to the United Kingdom